Air Max Africa was an airline based in Libreville, Gabon. It was established in 2002 as Air Max Gabon and operated charter and passenger flights in West Africa out of Libreville International Airport. The airline was shut down in 2006.

Fleet 
As of August 2006 the Air Max-Gabon fleet included only a single turboprop  Fokker F27 Mk300M.:

References

Defunct airlines of Gabon
Airlines established in 2002
Airlines disestablished in 2006
Companies based in Libreville
Gabonese companies established in 2002